is a professional squash player who represents Japan. He reached a career-high world ranking of World No. 146 in October 2013.

References

External links 
 
 

Japanese male squash players
Living people
1987 births
Squash players at the 2010 Asian Games
Squash players at the 2014 Asian Games
Asian Games competitors for Japan
Competitors at the 2009 World Games
21st-century Japanese people